Project Cumulus was a 1950s UK government initiative to investigate weather manipulation, in particular through cloud seeding experiments. Known jokingly internally as Operation Witch Doctor, the project was operational between 1949 and 1952. A conspiracy theory has circulated claiming that the Lynmouth Flood was caused by Project Cumulus. This claim is still ultimately unproven, and weather patterns have shown similar floods dating back to both the 18th and 19th centuries throughout Northern Wales and the UK.

Motivation
The military were interested in controlling the weather for several reasons, as detailed in the minutes of an Air Ministry meeting held on 3 November 1953. They included:
 "bogging down enemy movement";
 "incrementing the water flow in rivers and streams to hinder or stop enemy crossings";
 clearing fog from airfields.

Lynmouth disaster

On 16 August 1952 a severe flood occurred in the town of Lynmouth in north Devon. Nine inches (229 millimetres) of rain fell within twenty-four hours: "Ninety million tonnes of water swept down the narrow valley into Lynmouth" and the East Lyn River rose rapidly and burst its banks. Thirty-four people died and many buildings and bridges were seriously damaged.  According to the BBC, "North Devon experienced 250 times the normal August rainfall in 1952."

A conspiracy theory has circulated that the flood was caused by secret cloud seeding experiments conducted by the Royal Air Force. However, noting that the experiments were not secret, that the cloud seeding experiments were at the scale of individual clouds, and that the whole of the southwestern corner of the British Isles was affected by heavy rain at the time, the theory to whether the weather was impacted has been dismissed as "preposterous" by weather expert Philip Eden.

References

External links
The 1952 Flood Disaster in Context, Exmoor National Park Authority
"Weather", Royal Meteorological Society, July 1952.

Weather modification
Programmes of the Government of the United Kingdom
Royal Air Force deployments
Conspiracy theories